Brenda Schad is a former American model and founder and designer of Tribe of Two. She was born in the US, and has lived in New York, LA, Paris, Milan and Tokyo. She is fluent in English, French, Italian and Japanese.

Early life
Schad was born in 1968 to Native American parents in Walnut Creek, California. She was adopted by a military family. Schad stated she always knew she was adopted and knew who her natural mother was. Schad was approached to become a model when she was 14 years old while trying on a swimsuit at a store in Japan.

Education
Schad studied Religious Philosophy and Political Science at Sophia University in Tokyo, Japan.

Career
She has appeared on the cover of Cosmopolitan UK, Vogue, ELLE and GQ UK magazines, and has also appeared for designers such as Christian Dior, Valentino, Christian Lacroix, Azzedine Alaia, and Dolce & Gabbana, Yves Saint Laurent,Ralph Lauren,Fendi, Herve Leger, Chanel and Kenzo. Schad has also appeared in Wonderbra advertisements, where she got the nickname "Miss Wonderbra". Schad signed with Elite Model Management in New York, Ford Models in Paris and Premier Models in London.

Schad advocated Native American causes, and she founded the Native American Children's Fund in Oklahoma.

In 2010, Schad then went back to school and garnered her General Contractor license in California. She is fully licensed and bonded as of this writing.

In 2013 Schad started Tribe of Two, a luxury handbag company that was nominated in 2019 for the Accessories Council ACE design awards.

Personal life
In an interview Brenda stated by the age of 19 she was "modelling in Paris and had married a French man." She also stated she was "too young" and her parents didn't think it was a good decision. They later divorced, Schad raising their daughter Sterling as a single mother.

In an interview for Sky Magazine in 2001 Schad stated that she had dated British millionaire businessman Robert Hanson, whom she met at a party when he was Naomi Campbell's date.

In an August 2014 article, Schad was described as being a 46-year-old mother of two. She sued Fredrik Broberg, the father of her son, for child support in 2014 in New York.

Schad has an apartment in Gramercy Park, Manhattan and an apartment in Los Cabos, Mexico.

References

External links 
 
 
 

American adoptees
American female models
American people of Choctaw descent
Living people
People from Walnut Creek, California
1968 births
People from Gramercy Park
Female models from California
21st-century American women